The Robert O. Norris Bridge is a truss bridge that spans the Rappahannock River in Virginia, United States and serves as the crossing for State Route 3 over the river between Grey's Point on the Middlesex County side and the town of White Stone in Lancaster County. The span was opened on August 30, 1957, and replaced a ferry service directly West of where the current bridge is located. The bridge is maintained by the Virginia Department of Transportation. When first opened, the bridge was crossed by just over 1,000 vehicles per day, on average. Tolls were removed from the bridge in 1976, and by 1978 the average daily traffic had risen to over 2,500 vehicles per day. By 2006, traffic counts reached 11,309 vehicles per day but shrank to 6,900 Annual Average Daily Traffic in 2017.

History 

Originally initiated on November 16, 1938 by the creation of the Lower Rappahannock Bridge Commission, planning work on the bridge began in earnest in 1950, and construction began in 1954. Four workers were killed in construction accidents on the bridge.

Present Day 

Between the opening of the bridge and the placement of the current traffic safety barrier, there have been two known fatal accidents involving cars crashing off the bridge into the water below.

Prior to July 2021, Dominion Virginia Power operated a 115 kilovolt (kV) transmission line that was attached to the East side of the bridge. This bridge-mounted 115 kV transmission line was removed after a replacement underwater 115 kV transmission line was brought online. This transmission line replacement was identified by Dominion Power as a needed project in order to remove risk of violating mandated NERC standards. Increased inspection routines relating to the age of the bridge itself required the attached transmission line be de-energized each time the inspections were carried out. The Virginia State Corporation Commission (SCC) later ordered Dominion Power to route the new transmission line underwater.

Future 

The Robert O. Norris Bridge has been identified as a State of Good Repair Infrastructure asset in that the pavement and superstructure of the bridge are deemed structurally deficient and replacement should be performed at or before the end of its 75 year design lifespan in 2032. In addition, the Norris Bridge has been identified as being 'Fracture-critical' and the failure of one span could cause the total collapse of the structure much like the collapse of Minneapolis, Minnesota's I-35W Bridge in August 2007.

References

External links

 

Bridges completed in 1957
Road bridges in Virginia
Former toll bridges in Virginia
Truss bridges in the United States
Buildings and structures in Lancaster County, Virginia
Buildings and structures in Middlesex County, Virginia
Rappahannock River
1957 establishments in Virginia